Malleria is a genus of moths of the family Crambidae. It contains only one species, Malleria argenteofulva, which is found in Brazil (Santa Catarina).

References

Natural History Museum Lepidoptera genus database

Musotiminae
Taxa named by Eugene G. Munroe
Crambidae genera
Monotypic moth genera